Lee Jeong-im (born 1 July 1971) is a South Korean table tennis player. She competed in the women's singles event at the 1992 Summer Olympics.

References

1971 births
Living people
South Korean female table tennis players
Olympic table tennis players of South Korea
Table tennis players at the 1992 Summer Olympics
Place of birth missing (living people)
20th-century South Korean women